Khiji Tholedemba (3440m) is the highest and the most attractive hill located in western Okhaldhunga district of Nepal.  
Khiji Tholedemba is located in Khiji Chandeshwori near Khijiphalate and Khijikati in Okhaldhunga district and rest of the hills are located in Dolakha, Ramechhap and Solukhumbu. From Phulchowk (Lalitpur), these hills were used for survey of Mount Everest in the past. The panoramic view of Gaura Parvat, Gaurishankar, Himalayas, Numbur mountain range to Mount Everest can be viewed form Khiji Toledemba. 
High mountain view, Flora, diverse culture of ethnic groups Sunuwar, Sherpa, Bhuje, Chetri and other minorities are the main attraction of this area.

Etymology
According to the legend, the name Khiji Tholedamba comes from Sunuwar language. The English translation is as follows:
 Khi = House
 Ji, Ja, Cha = name of sunuwar
 Thole = Hill, High, or Top 
 Demba = to be heap, mass heap of snow, top of peak

Transport
 Kathmandu to Khiji Chandeswori by bus or by flight 
 Phetale to Chilimdanda to Lamje Chuli Daduwa to Mele
 Tholedemba to Phalate Bazar to Khiji Chandeswori to Kathmandu

References 

Tourist attractions in Nepal
Mountains of Koshi Province